John Petersson (born 22 January 1970, Copenhagen, Denmark) is president of the European Paralympic Committee and a former swimmer from Denmark. He is also one of the 12 members of the International Paralympic Committee and he has been a member of the Danish Handicap-Federal Board of Directors since 2000. Petersson is an accountant who studied at Copenhagen Business School.

Paralympics career 
John Petersson participated for the first time at the Paralympic Games in 1984 and ended his career at the Paralympic Games in Sydney in 2000. It was during the games in 1988, that he by a journalist got nicknamed 'Piskeriset', which has kept by his side. John Petersson won a total of fifteen Paralympic medals in his career. 
 5 Paralympic Games (1984-2000): 6 gold, 2 silver, 7 bronze, 6 world records
 3 World Championships (1986-1998): 4 gold, 3 silver, 2 bronze, 4 world records
 1 European Championships (1995): 2 gold, 1 silver, 1 bronze

Awards 
 2009: Danish Sports Award for People with an impairment by the Danish Minister of Culture and Sport

Personal life 
Petersson is married and has two children.

References

External links
 International Paralympic Committee biography

Living people
1970 births
International Paralympic Committee members